Parkhurst is a historic home at Harwood, Anne Arundel County, Maryland.  It is a large two-story frame house with a complex floor plan, reflecting the evolution of the dwelling. The original Gothic Revival vernacular, center-passage, double-pile plan house was constructed about 1848-1850 by Richard S. Mercer. Alterations and additions were made in the early 20th century, giving the house a Neoclassical appearance. Also on the property are a timber framed mid-19th century smokehouse and an early-20th century frame tobacco barn.

It was listed on the National Register of Historic Places in 2001.
Tobacco barn was replaced in 2014

References

External links
, including photo from 1974, at Maryland Historical Trust

Houses on the National Register of Historic Places in Maryland
Houses in Anne Arundel County, Maryland
Gothic Revival architecture in Maryland
Houses completed in 1850
National Register of Historic Places in Anne Arundel County, Maryland